Lall is both a surname and a given name. Notable people with the name include:

Surname:
Hemant Lall (born 1951), American bridge player and father of bridge pro Justin Lall (1986–2020)
K. B. Lall (died 2005), civil servant of India and a member of ICS
Kesar Lall (1926–2012), Nepalese folklorist and writer
Muni Lall, former Union minister of state of India
Premjit Lall (1940–2008), professional tennis player from India
Rajiv Lall, managing director and vice chairman of Infrastructure Development Finance Company (IDFC)
Raul Lall (born 1994), Guyanese judoka
Sanjaya Lall (1940–2005), development economist, Professor of Economics and Fellow of Green College, Oxford University
Vijay Lall, Lt General, Indian Army General Officer (born 1942)
Vivek Lall, aerospace scientist

Given name:
Nautam Bhagwan Lall Bhatt (1909–2005), Indian physicist
Brijmohan Lall Munjal, Indian businessman and chairman of Hero Group
Lall Sawh, Trinidadian urologist in the Caribbean and Latin America
Mutty Lall Seal (1792–1854), Indian businessman and philanthropist
Mohan Lall Shrimal, former chief justice of Sikkim High Court
Lall Singh (1909–1985), early Indian Test cricketer

See also
The In-Between World of Vikram Lall, novel by M. G. Vassanji, published in 2003 by Doubleday Canada
Lalla
Lalli
Lally (disambiguation)
Lallé (disambiguation)